Persian Speculative Art and Literature Award is an annual literary award for Persian media in the field of speculative fiction printed in Persian language. This award is governed by a board of trustees and considered a branch of SFG (Speculative Fiction Group, formerly Persian Fantasy Academy).

Award categories
Best Sf&f short story selected by jury of Persian Speculative Fiction Short Story Contest.
Best Sf&f translator of the year.
Best Sf&f publisher of the year.
The most active person in Sf&f literature in the year.

History
Established at 2004, based on Persian Speculative Fiction Short Story Contest and developed to become the only non-governmental literary award in Iran which is continued to 5 terms in 6 years.

Persian Speculative Short Story Contest

This award is given to the best short story of the year in the field of science fiction, horror fiction or fantasy genre. The winner is selected among all participants of the yearly contest. The contest starts in autumn every year and results is announced during the next summer. All participated stories should be written in Persian but the authors may be from any nationality.

First award has given in year 2004 and the jury members were all belonged to Persian Fantasy Academy Group.

However, after that the group invited some well-known and notable authors, critics and translators of the Persian literature to judgment committee, among these  were: Media Kashigar, Reza Alizade, Mitra Eliati, Arash Hejazi, Peyman Ghasemkhani, Shahram Eghbal Zadeh, Vida Eslamie and Mehdi Yazdani Khoram.

References
Website for the award

Iranian speculative fiction
Persian-language literature
Iranian literary awards
Awards established in 2004
Speculative fiction awards
Fantasy awards